The 2010 European Track Championships were the European Championships for track cycling. The junior and under 23 riders events took place in Saint Petersburg, Russia from 10 to 15 September 2010.

Medal summary

Under 23

Junior

Medal table

References

European Track Championships, 2010
under-23
European Track Championships, 2010
International cycle races hosted by Russia
Sports competitions in Saint Petersburg